Propacetamol is a prodrug form of paracetamol which is formed from esterification of paracetamol, and the carboxylic acid diethylglycine. This has the advantage of making it more water-soluble. It is used in post-operative care and is delivered by I.V. It is given if the patient is unable to take oral or rectally delivered paracetamol and nonsteroidal anti-inflammatory drugs (NSAIDs) are contraindicated. The onset of analgesia from propacetamol is more rapid than paracetamol given orally.
2 grams of propacetamol are equivalent to 1g of paracetamol.

See also 
 Paracetamol

References 

Acetanilides
Phenol ethers
Carboxylate esters
Diethylamino compounds